George Henry Holdcroft (23 January 1909 – 17 April 1983), also known as Harry Holdcroft, was an England international football goalkeeper.

He played for Port Vale, Darlington, Everton, Accrington Stanley, Barnsley, Burnley, Bury, Oldham Athletic, Manchester United, Southport, Leyland Motors, Morecambe and Chorley. However it was for his seven years at Preston North End, from 1932 to 1939, that he became well known. He helped the club to win promotion out of the Second Division in 1933–34, and kept goal as Preston lifted the FA Cup in 1938. He also represented England twice in 1936.

Early and personal life
George Henry Holdcroft was born on 23 January 1909 in Norton le Moors, near Leek, Staffordshire. His parents were John Jabez and Annie, a coal mine loader and grocer respectively. He qualified as a heavy worker inspector of motor vehicle component parts. He married Phyllis Jack in 1933.

Club career
Holdcroft played for local clubs, Biddulph, Norton Druids and Whitfield Colliery before joining Port Vale as an amateur in August 1926, signing professional forms the following month. He only played ten Second Division games for the Vale, six in 1926–27 and four in 1927–28, before being handed a free transfer to Third Division North club Darlington in May 1928. He was the firm first choice for the club and played more than 83 games in his three years at Feethams. The club struggled at the foot of the table in 1928–29, before finishing third in 1929–30 and 11th in 1930–31.

In 1931, he was signed by Everton of the First Division. The "Toffees" won the league title in 1931–32, however Holdcroft failed to get into the first team at Goodison Park and moved to Preston North End of the Second Division. He went on to play in 172 consecutive league and FA Cup matches for the "Lambs". A ninth-place finish in 1932–33 was followed by promotion in 1933–34. Top-flight football at Deepdale continued right up until the outbreak of World War II, as Preston finished 11th in 1934–35, 7th in 1935–36, 14th in 1936–37, third in 1937–38 and ninth in 1938–39. Holdcroft also played in the 1938 FA Cup Final victory over Huddersfield Town at Wembley, keeping a clean sheet over 120 minutes in a 1–0 win.

During the war he guested for Accrington Stanley, Barnsley, Burnley, Bury, Oldham Athletic, Manchester United and Southport, and also played for non-league clubs Leyland Motors, Morecambe and Chorley.

International career
Holdcroft was selected to play for England against Wales on 17 October 1936. The following month he won a second international cap against Ireland.

Career statistics
Source:

Honours
Preston North End
Football League Second Division second-place promotion: 1933–34
FA Cup: 1938

References

1909 births
1983 deaths
Footballers from Staffordshire
English footballers
England international footballers
Association football goalkeepers
Port Vale F.C. players
Darlington F.C. players
Everton F.C. players
Preston North End F.C. players
Accrington Stanley F.C. (1891) wartime guest players
Barnsley F.C. wartime guest players
Burnley F.C. wartime guest players
Bury F.C. wartime guest players
Oldham Athletic A.F.C. wartime guest players
Manchester United F.C. wartime guest players
Southport F.C. wartime guest players
Morecambe F.C. players
Chorley F.C. players
Leyland Motors F.C. players
Stockport County F.C. wartime guest players
English Football League players
English Football League representative players
FA Cup Final players